Spheterista infaustana is a moth of the family Tortricidae. It was first described by Lord Walsingham in 1907. It is endemic to the Hawaiian islands of Kauai, Oahu, Molokai, Maui and Hawaii.

The larvae feed on the leaves of Pipturus species, skeletonizing them, and hiding in webbed-together leaves at the tip, or a bit of the turned-over edge. Pupation takes place in similar places.

External links

Archipini
Endemic moths of Hawaii